Vennela  is a 2012 Telugu film directed by Vennela Kishore and produced by Vasu & Varma on GR8 Films banner. It is a sequel to the critically acclaimed 2005 Telugu film Vennela by Deva Katta. It stars Chaitanya Krishna, Monal Gajjar, Bramhanandam & Vennela Kishore in the lead. Sunil Kashyap provided the music while Suresh Bhargav handled the cinematography. It was released on 21 September 2012.

Plot

The story is set in Bangkok. Krishna is a happy go lucky man who falls for Vennela in first sight. However, he learns that she was engaged to someone else, but tries his luck. Vennela too loves him, but realizes that he is a fraud. Rest of the story is about how they work out their differences.

Cast
 Chaitanya Krishna as Krishna Krishna
 Monal Gajjar as Vennela
 Bramhanandam as Papachand
 Vennela Kishore as Khadar Basha
 Sravan as Sravan
 Madhu as Sunil
 Harish as Yuvak
 Raghu Babu

Production 
While shooting for Orange (2010) in Australia, Vennela Kishore came up with the idea for this film.

Reception
The movie opened to negative reviews. Haricharan Pudupeddi of DNA India gave a review stating "Vennela  is loathsome with the senseless 'bathroom humour' that runs throughout the film. Vennela  is one of the worst comedy films of recent times." IBN Live stated "After watching the trailers, most of us did not expect anything more from Vennela  than low brow comedy. What came as a surprise was that the film did not pack a sensible story that might have made us sit through the haranguing second half." The Times Of India gave a review stating "The performances vary from loony to queer. It would be unfair to call it acting. What the characters just indulge in is absolute tom-foolery of degenerated variety. Chaitanya has a presence, but really has nothing much to do as does Monal. Let's just say, the other departments are in tune with the rest of the film." The Hindu gave a review stating "From the Kya Kool Hai Hum clan of film-making, it tries to be like American Pie, but fails miserably. It's just a mindless excuse for a film, filling up the 70 mm. The film is not for those looking for cinema, but for those with raging hormones, looking for a cheap laugh." 123telugu.com gave a review stating "If you are a fan of the original Vennela and go in for this movie expecting something similar, you will be sorely disappointed. I was a fan of Vennela Kishore the actor. But I am not going to be a fan of Vennela Kishore the director." Way2movies gave a review stating "Except for few comedy parts, Vennela  has nothing to offer."

Soundtrack

The movie's audio release function was held on 5 February 2012 at Hyderabad. Monal Gajjar, Madhurima, Chaitanya Krishna, Manoj Manchu, Nara Rohit, and V. V. Vinayak graced the event.

References